Henry Slattery (born 22 January 1986) is a former professional Australian rules footballer who played for the Essendon Football Club in the Australian Football League (AFL).

Slattery was recruited by Essendon with selection 46 in the 2004 AFL Draft. He had previously played for West Adelaide in the SANFL.  He made his debut in 2005 against St Kilda, kicking a goal in what was Matthew Lloyd's 200th AFL game.  His first three seasons were limited by hip and knee injuries before he cemented his place in the Essendon starting team, often as a small, lock-down defender or defensive midfielder.

At the end of the 2012 AFL season, Slattery decided to leave Essendon in search of greater opportunities at AFL level, after playing in only 2 games for the year, nominating South Australia as his preferred destination. He was not selected in the 2012 AFL Draft, but was recruited by the Port Adelaide Magpies in the South Australian National Football League (SANFL).

Slattery, along with 33 other Essendon players, was found guilty of using a banned performance enhancing substance, thymosin beta-4, as part of Essendon's sports supplements program during the 2012 season. He and his team-mates were initially found not guilty in March 2015 by the AFL Anti-Doping Tribunal, but a guilty verdict was returned in January 2016 after an appeal by the World Anti-Doping Agency. He was suspended for two years which, with backdating, ended in November 2016; as a result, he served approximately fourteen months of his suspension and missed the entire 2016 season, during which time he had intended to coach Nuriootpa Rovers Football Club in the Barossa Light & Gawler Football League.

Statistics
 Statistics are correct to end of 2012 season.

|- style="background-color: #EAEAEA"
! scope="row" style="text-align:center" | 2005
|  || 34 || 4 || 2 || 0 || 17 || 17 || 34 || 7 || 6 || 0.5 || 0.0 || 4.2 || 4.2 || 8.5 || 1.8 || 1.5
|-
! scope="row" style="text-align:center" | 2006
|  || 20 || 8 || 0 || 1 || 31 || 44 || 75 || 30 || 16 || 0.0 || 0.1 || 3.9 || 5.5 || 9.4 || 3.8 || 2.0
|- style="background-color: #EAEAEA"
! scope="row" style="text-align:center" | 2007
|  || 20 || 20 || 4 || 3 || 91 || 96 || 187 || 55 || 78 || 0.2 || 0.2 || 4.6 || 4.8 || 9.4 || 2.8 || 3.9
|-
! scope="row" style="text-align:center" | 2008
|  || 20 || 20 || 3 || 2 || 105 || 118 || 223 || 59 || 74 || 0.2 || 0.1 || 5.2 || 5.9 || 11.2 || 3.0 || 3.7
|- style="background-color: #EAEAEA"
! scope="row" style="text-align:center" | 2009
|  || 20 || 21 || 2 || 3 || 135 || 145 || 280 || 76 || 80 || 0.1 || 0.1 || 6.4 || 6.9 || 13.3 || 3.6 || 3.8
|- 
! scope="row" style="text-align:center" | 2010
|  || 20 || 13 || 1 || 1 || 72 || 68 || 140 || 38 || 54 || 0.1 || 0.1 || 5.5 || 5.2 || 10.8 || 2.9 || 4.2
|- style="background-color: #EAEAEA"
! scope="row" style="text-align:center" | 2011
|  || 20 || 8 || 0 || 1 || 48 || 33 || 81 || 19 || 34 || 0.0 || 0.1 || 6.0 || 4.1 || 10.1 || 2.4 || 4.2
|-
! scope="row" style="text-align:center" | 2012
|  || 20 || 2 || 0 || 0 || 5 || 4 || 9 || 0 || 2 || 0.0 || 0.0 || 2.5 || 2.0 || 4.5 || 0.0 || 1.0
|- class="sortbottom"
! colspan=3| Career
! 96
! 12
! 11
! 504
! 525
! 1029
! 284
! 344
! 0.1
! 0.1
! 5.2
! 5.5
! 10.7
! 3.0
! 2.6
|}

References

External links

 
 

1986 births
Essendon Football Club players
West Adelaide Football Club players
Living people
Australian rules footballers from South Australia
University of Melbourne alumni
Port Adelaide Football Club (SANFL) players
Port Adelaide Football Club players (all competitions)
Australian sportspeople in doping cases
Bendigo Football Club players